José Luis Martínez Bazán (February 11, 1942 – July 21, 2015 In the Villa del Cerro) was an Uruguayan football referees. He is known for having refereed one match in the 1986 FIFA World Cup in Mexico and also refereed the 1986 Intercontinental Cup.

He died on July 21, 2015, aged 73.

References

1942 births
2015 deaths
Uruguayan football referees
FIFA World Cup referees
1986 FIFA World Cup referees
Copa América referees